The 2012 Jade Solid Gold Best Ten Music Awards Presentation (Chinese: 2012年度十大勁歌金曲頒獎典禮) was held on January 13, 2013. It is part of the Jade Solid Gold Best Ten Music Awards Presentation series.

Top 10 song awards
The top 10 songs (十大勁歌金曲) of 2012 are as follows.

Additional awards

References
《2012年度十大勁歌金曲頒獎典禮》官方網

Cantopop
Jade Solid Gold Best Ten Music Awards Presentation, 2012